Borucin may refer to:

Borucin, Greater Poland Voivodeship (west-central Poland)
Borucin, Kuyavian-Pomeranian Voivodeship (north-central Poland)
Borucin, Silesian Voivodeship (south Poland)
Borucin, West Pomeranian Voivodeship (north-west Poland)